Endolasia is a genus of snout moths. It was described by George Hampson in 1896.

Species
 Endolasia melanoleuca Hampson, 1896
 Endolasia transvaalica Hampson, 1926

References

Phycitinae